Lasioglossum prasinum is a species of insect belonging to the family Halictidae.

It is native to Europe.

References

Halictidae